Khirbat al-Sawamir was a Palestinian Arab village in the Haifa Subdistrict. It was depopulated during the 1948 Arab-Israeli War on May 22, 1948. It was located 22 kilometres south of Haifa.

History
Burial places cut into rock, and ceramics from the  Byzantine era have been found at Khirbat al-Sawamir.

Ottoman era
Khirbat al-Sawamir  was incorporated into the Ottoman Empire in 1517 with all of Palestine, and in 1596 it appeared in the  tax registers under the name of   Sawamir, as being in the  nahiya ("subdistrict") of Ramla, which was under the administration of the liwa ("district") of Gaza. It had a population of 3 household,  an estimated 17 persons, who were all Muslims. They paid a fixed tax-rate of 25 % on agricultural products, including wheat, barley,  summer crops,   goats and beehives, in addition to occasional revenues; a total of 5,500 akçe.

The village appeared, though misplaced, under the name of  Sawama on the map that Pierre Jacotin compiled during Napoleon's invasion of 1799.

In 1859,  the population was estimated to be 120 persons, with 15 feddans of cultivated area.

In 1882, the PEF's Survey of Western Palestine described  Suamir as a small  adobe village at the edge of the plain, with a well to the west.

In the early twentieth century, travelers noted that the village was better built that the usual Fellahin village.

British Mandate era
In the 1922 census of Palestine, conducted by the  British Mandate authorities, Al Sawamer  had a population of 17 Muslims. In the 1931 census, the population was counted with that of Ayn Ghazal, and together they had 1,439 Muslims in  247 houses. In the Village Statistics, 1945, the name of the village was not mentioned.

1948, aftermath
Following the 1948 war the area was incorporated into the State of Israel. The moshav of Ofer was established in 1950 partly on the land of Khirbat al-Sawamir, and partly on the land of  Ayn Ghazal.

In 1992 the village site was described: "The ruins of two walls (formerly parts of a building) are visible at the site, which has been fenced in with barbed wire. Pine trees occupy much of the land on the site, and pomegranate and fig trees and cactuses are scattered throughout. The surrounding coastal lands are used by Israeli farmers for growing vegetables and fruit, particularly bananas."

References

Bibliography

 
 
 

Mülinen, Egbert Friedrich von 1908, Beiträge zur Kenntnis des Karmels "Separateabdruck aus der Zeitschrift des Deutschen Palëstina-Vereins Band XXX (1907) Seite 117-207 und Band XXXI (1908) Seite 1-258."

External links
Welcome To al-Sawamir
 al-Sawamir,  Zochrot
Survey of Western Palestine, Map 8: IAA, Wikimedia commons  

Arab villages depopulated during the 1948 Arab–Israeli War
District of Haifa